The Dwarves are an American punk rock band formed in Chicago, Illinois and based in San Francisco, California as of 2009.

Formed as a garage punk band under the name Suburban Nightmare, their career subsequently saw them move in a hardcore direction before settling into an eclectic punk rock sound emphasizing intentionally shocking lyrics. They have been described as "one of the last true bastions of punk rock ideology in the contemporary musical age".

History

The original members of the Dwarves began making music together in the mid-1980s as teenagers in the Chicago garage rock outfit, Suburban Nightmare, which was compared to The Sonics, and which has been described as part of the Paisley Underground scene. This era of the Dwarves is captured on Lick It(the psychedelic years 83-86) a 34 track collection put out by Recess records in 1999.

The band became notorious for self-mutilation, on-stage sex, and taking hard drugs, and their live shows would often only last around fifteen minutes, occasionally cut short due to injury caused by spectators. The band's sound began to evolve beyond its early garage roots with their second (nine-minute long) LP, Toolin' for a Warm Teabag, which saw the band drifting towards a more truculent punk rock sound, influenced by GG Allin. Recess records issued Free Cocaine 86–88 in 1999, a 39-song collection that shows the band's transition to the nihilistic style that took them to the Sub Pop era. The band released Blood Guts & Pussy on Sub Pop in 1990. By this time the Dwarves had dropped their early psychedelic sensibilities and morphed into a hardcore punk band. The Blood Guts & Pussy LP was followed up by EP Lucifer's Crank released by No.6 Records, as well as another Sub Pop LP, the metal-punk Thank Heaven For Little Girls, both in 1991.

In 1993 the band issued a press release stating their guitarist HeWhoCannotBeNamed had been stabbed to death in Philadelphia. Though this later turned out to be a hoax, the band even went as far as to attach a tribute to the "late" guitarist on their 1993 Sub Pop-released album Sugarfix. Sub Pop did not respond well to the hoax and summarily dropped the band from its label. The Dwarves reformed in 1997, releasing The Dwarves Are Young and Good Looking (described by Adam Bregman of AllMusic as "the beginning of a new Dwarves...one that plays real songs, had a set list, and left the club unbloodied"), and its 2000 followup The Dwarves Come Clean. 

In 2004 the band released The Dwarves Must Die, its first LP for the indie label Sympathy for the Record Industry, which featured guest appearances from Dexter Holland (The Offspring), Nick Oliveri (Queens of the Stone Age), Nash Kato (Urge Overkill), and voice actor Gary Owens. Dahlia was assaulted by Josh Homme of QOTSA before a Dwarves show in Los Angeles in 2004, which saw Homme placed on summary probation for thirty-six months.

In other media
In the film Me, Myself & Irene, Jim Carrey is seen singing along to Dwarves "Motherfucker", which Dahlia later said he got "tens of thousands of dollars" for. 

In 2000, the band offered the track "River City Rapist" to George W. Bush as his presidential campaign song. The Bush campaign did not use the song.

The Dwarves' cover of the Norwegian rock band Turbonegro's song "Hobbit Motherfuckers" from the Turbonegro tribute album "Alpha Motherfuckers" can be heard playing in the comic book store scene in the 2000's indie film "Ghost World" albeit without Blag Dhalia's profanity laden vocals. This song does not appear on the soundtrack album for the film.

In 2009, Blag and HeWhoCannotBeNamed were immortalised as Bobbleheads by Aggronautix.

Band members
Singer Blag Dahlia (a.k.a. Julius Seizure, born Paul Cafaro), and guitarist HeWhoCannotBeNamed (a.k.a. Pete Vietnamcheque) have always been the two core members of the group. The lineup has shifted around them, and currently consists of members "Rex Everything" on bass and vocals, "Fresh Prince of Darkness" on guitar, and "Hunter Down" on drums. Former members include "Dutch Ovens", "Gregory Pecker", "Chip Fracture", "Wholley Smokes", "Clint Torres", "Tazzie Bushweed", "Thrusty Otis", "Crash Landon", "Wreck Tom", and "Vadge Moore", among others. Drummer Josh Freese appears on many Dwarves recordings.

Musical style
The Dwarves are known for their simple, loud, yet nuanced punk repertoire, and controversial lyrics. Since the garage punk sound of their early days, they developed a more direct hardcore punk sound, often identified as "scum punk" due to the intentional perversity of the lyrics. Around the turn of millennium, the Dwarves developed more of a manic pop punk influence. Bits of hardcore, surf rock, pop, hip-hop, and rock 'n' roll all factor into the band's current punk rock sound.

Their shows have been notable for some aggressive fights on stage (with the audience and even a cop), and because HeWhoCannotBeNamed performs either in nothing but a jockstrap or totally nude, apart from his trademark "Rey Mysterio" wrestling mask.

Cover art
Many of their album covers were intentionally confrontational, often featuring dwarf actor Bobby Faust with an assortment of naked women, sometimes with sacrilegious themes such as re-enacting the Crucifixion. Faust posed sodomizing a rabbit covered in blood for their 1990 album Blood Guts & Pussy - followed up a decade later, with a similar theme, this time covered in soap suds, for Come Clean.

Side projects
 Former drummer Sigh Moan formed Specula with Specter Spec, releasing the Erupt album in 1995.
 Blag Dahlia has worked as a producer for Joey Santiago's band The Martinis, and is also half of the duo The Uncontrollable with Nick Oliveri.
 Blag Dahlia has also performed solo acoustic sets, which he described as his "camp counselor guy routine", released a bluegrass album, Blackgrass in 1995 under the name Earl Lee Grace.
 Blag Dahlia was a part the side project Penetration Moon, which released a sole single, "Fifth a Day", in 1991.
 Blag Dahlia has published two books, Armed to the Teeth with Lipstick (1998) and Nina (2006).
 Blag Dahlia sings "Doing the Sponge" in the SpongeBob SquarePants episode The Chaperone, which originally aired on Nickelodeon October 2, 1999. "Doing the Sponge" is written by Salt Peter (Peter Straus), former bassist for the Dwarves.
 Blag Dahlia's most recent side project is pop/rock band Candy Now!, which he formed with Angelina Moysov of Persephone's Bees.
 HeWhoCannotBeNamed has released two solo albums, which have featured guest appearances from his fellow Dwarves members, including Blag Dahlia. "Humaniterrorist", a vinyl only release in 2012, and "Love/Hate", a compact disc-only release in 2013.
 Blag Dahlia on Vocals recording The Who's "The Kids are Alright" with Peted on guitar of The Adicts and Cell Block 5
 Blag Dahlia sings vocals on the Royce Cracker single "Who Put the Methamphetamine in Mr. Everything".  
 Rex Everything sings vocals on the Royce Cracker single "Doin' Whatche Say". The Royce Cracker Dwarves split 7-inch was released on Zodiac Killer Records (ZKR038) in 2009.
Marc Diamond plays guitar, and Andy Selway plays drums on the Royce Cracker single "Meth Stop Calling".

Discography

Albums
 A Hard Day's Nightmare (as The Surburban Nightmare) LP (Midnight Records, 1985, MIR LP 109)
 Horror Stories LP (Voxx Records, 1986, VXS 200.037)
 Toolin' For A Warm Teabag LP (Nasty Gash Records, 1988, NG 001)
 Blood Guts & Pussy LP (Sub Pop, 1990, SP 67)
 Thank Heaven for Little Girls LP (Sub Pop, 1991, SP 126)
 Sugarfix LP (Sub Pop, 1993, SP 197)
 The Dwarves Are Young and Good Looking LP (Theologian Records, 1997, T53)
 The Dwarves Come Clean LP (Epitaph Records, 2000, 86575 1)
 How To Win Friends And Influence People (Reptilian Records, 2001, REP 068)
 The Dwarves Must Die (2004)
 The Dwarves Are Born Again (2011)
 The Dwarves Invented Rock & Roll (2014)
 Radio Free Dwarves (Riot Style Records / Greedy) (2015) 
 Take Back The Night (Burger Records / Greedy) (2018)

Compilations
 Free Cocaine DLP (Recess Records, 1999, RECESS No. 51)
 Lick It DLP (Recess Records, 1999, RECESS No. 52)
 Greedy Boot 1 (2005) - only available from their website

Live
 Toolin' for Lucifers Crank (1996)
 Fuck You Up and Get Live (2005)
 Radio Free Dwarves (2015)

EPs
 Lucifer's Crank cassette EP (self issued, 1988, reissued on 7-inch by Rough Trade No.6 (Karbon), 1991, KAR 13/7)
 We Kill Cock Throbbin''' cassette-EP (self-issued, 1988)
 Underworld / Lies / Down By The River (Sub Pop, 1993, SP 183B)
 Fake ID, Bitch 10-inch Vinyl (2011)

Singles
 "Lick It" 7-inch (Ubik, 1988)
 "She's Dead" / "Fuckhead" 7-inch (Sub Pop SP50, 1990)
 "Drugstore" / "Detention Girl" / "Astro Boy" / "Motherfucker" 7-inch (Sub Pop SP81, 1990)
 "Sit on My Face" / "I Wanna Kill Your Boyfriend" (by Seizure) split 7-inch (Sympathy For the Record Industry, SFTRI 132, 1991)
 "Lucky Tonight" / "Speed Demon" / "Dairy Queen" 7-inch (Sub Pop SP21/163, 1992)
 "Anybody Out There" / "Who Cares" 7-inch (Sub Pop SP84/254, 1993)
 "That's Rock 'n' Roll" / "I'm a Man" 7-inch (Sympathy For The Record Industry SFTRI 280, 1994)
 Gentlemen Prefer Blondes (But Blondes Don't Like Cripples) 7-inch EP (Man's Ruin MR005, 1995)
 "I Will Deny You" / "The Dwarves are Young and Good Looking" / "One Life to Live" 7-inch (Reptilian REP018, 1997)
 "We Must Have Blood" / "Surfing the Intercourse Barn" 7-inch (Man's Ruin MR051, 1997)
 Dwarves/Royce Cracker 7-inch Vinyl/CD (Zodiac Killer Records ZKR038, 2009)
 "Trailer Trash" 7-inch (Recess Records, 2014)
 "Get Up & Get High" 7-inch (No Balls Records, 2014)
 "Gentleman Blag" 7-inch (Fat Wreck Chords, 2015)
 "Fun to Try" 7-inch (Burger Records, 2015)
 Dwarves/Svetlanas split 7-inch (Altercation Records, 2016)

Videos
 Fuck You Up and Get Live DVD (2004)
 FEFU DVD (2006)

Music videos
 I'm a Living Sickness (1986)
 Drugstore (1990)
 We Must Have Blood (1997)
 Over You (2000)
 Salt Lake City (2004)
 FEFU (2004)
 Massacre (2005)
 Stop Me (2011)
 The Band That Wouldn't Die (2011)
 You'll Never Take Us Alive (2012)
 Devil's Level (2018)

Compilation appearances
 1999: Short Music for Short People (Fat Wreck Chords, Track The Band That Wouldn't Die)
 2017: Punk against Trump (Denizen Records, Track Trailer Trash'')

See also
Recess Records
Sub Pop
Epitaph Records

References

External links
Official band website
Blag Dahlia in Loren Cass Film
Four questions with The Dwarves lead singer Blag Dahlia
Feature: The New Pop Idol: Candy Now and Blag Dahlia?!

Epitaph Records artists
Hardcore punk groups from Illinois
Musical groups from Chicago
Garage punk groups
Sympathy for the Record Industry artists
Garage rock groups from Illinois